Eupithecia leucostaxis is a moth in the family Geometridae. It is found from the southern and western Himalaya (Nainital, Nepal, Tibet and Yunnan) to northern Myanmar.

References

Moths described in 1926
leucostaxis
Moths of Asia